John Ashwardby (fl. 1392) was a follower of John Wycliffe.

Ashwardby is described by Tanner, probably by an inference from his surname, as coming from Lincolnshire, England. He became a Fellow of Oriel College, Oxford, 'master of theology,' and vicar of St Mary's church.

Attaching himself to Wycliffe's group, Ashwardby appears to have been active in preaching, lecturing, and writing, as an opponent specially of the mendicant orders, and he engaged in controversy with the Carmelite, Richard Maydeston, a chaplain of John of Gaunt. In spite of this, however, he filled the office of 'commissary' or Vice-Chancellor of Oxford University in 1391.

References

Year of birth unknown
Year of death unknown
People from Lincolnshire
14th-century English Roman Catholic priests
Fellows of Oriel College, Oxford
Vice-Chancellors of the University of Oxford
English male writers